Jane's Appearance Tour was the third concert tour by singer Jane Zhang, in support of her fifth studio album, Reform.

Background 
As the queen of the mainland, Jane Zhang debuted in six years and set a proud music score. She launched two popular albums, "Believe in Jane" and "Reform", and won the best female singer of the Beijing Pop Music Award five times. She was shortlisted for the 2011 MTV European Music Awards and held 15 individual concerts. "My Appearance Tour" is a performance by Jane Zhang to fans. Jane said that "My Appearance Tour" is a summary of her past six years of music history, including popular songs that are familiar to people, and some English songs that are covered.

Shows

References 

2011 concert tours
Jane Zhang concert tours